William Collazo  (born November 7, 1979) is a Puerto Rican former professional baseball pitcher. During the 2007 season, he appeared in six games for the New York Mets of Major League Baseball (MLB). Since 2016, Collazo has worked as a minor league pitching coach in the Toronto Blue Jays organization.

Collazo graduated from Florida International University, where he went 13–1 as a senior and helped his team to the NCAA Division I Baseball Championship tournament. He was drafted by the Atlanta Braves in the 10th round of the 2001 Major League Baseball draft. Collazo played for the Braves, Los Angeles Angels, and New York Mets organizations. He was called up to the Mets on September 1, and made his major league debut on September 5, 2007, against the Cincinnati Reds. He became a free agent at the end of the  season and signed a minor league contract with the Florida Marlins.

He last played in the Toronto Blue Jays organization from 2010 to 2012. Collazo was the pitching coach for the Short Season-A Vancouver Canadians in 2016. On January 19, 2017, he was promoted to be the pitching coach for the Class-A Lansing Lugnuts.

In July 2019, Collazo was named the pitching coach at FIU.

He was let go by FIU after the 2022 season.

See also
 List of Major League Baseball players from Puerto Rico

References

External links

1979 births
Living people
2006 World Baseball Classic players
Arkansas Travelers players
Binghamton Mets players
Dunedin Blue Jays players
FIU Panthers baseball coaches
FIU Panthers baseball players
Gigantes de Carolina players
Greenville Braves players
Gulf Coast Blue Jays players
Jamestown Jammers players
Las Vegas 51s players
Macon Braves players
Major League Baseball pitchers
Major League Baseball players from Puerto Rico
Myrtle Beach Pelicans players
Norfolk Tides players
New Hampshire Fisher Cats players
New Orleans Zephyrs players
New York Mets players
People from Carolina, Puerto Rico
Salt Lake Stingers players
Tiburones de La Guaira players
Puerto Rican expatriate baseball players in Venezuela
Kirkwood Community College alumni
Junior college baseball players in the United States
Waterloo Bucks players